This is a list of countries with territory that straddles more than one continent, known as transcontinental states or intercontinental states.

Contiguous transcontinental countries are states that have one continuous or immediately-adjacent piece of territory that spans a continental boundary, most commonly the line that separates Europe and Asia. By contrast, non-contiguous transcontinental countries are those states that have portions of territory that are separated from one another either by a body of water or by other countries (such as in the case of France). Most non-contiguous transcontinental countries are countries with dependent territories like Denmark with Greenland, but can be countries that have fully integrated former dependent territories in their central states like France with its overseas regions.

For the purposes of this article, a seven-continent model is assumed based on common terms of reference by English language geographers. Combined continents like "the Americas" and "Eurasia" are not acknowledged or referenced. The boundary between Europe and Asia is largely conventional (much of it over land), and several conventions remained in use well into the 20th century. However, the now-prevalent convention—which has been in use by some cartographers since about 1850—follows the Caucasus northern chain, the Ural River and the Ural Mountains, is used for the purposes of this list. This convention results in several countries such as in the case of Azerbaijan, Kazakhstan and Turkey finding themselves almost entirely in 'Asia', with a few small enclaves or districts technically in 'Europe'. Notwithstanding these anomalies, this list of transcontinental or intercontinental states respects the convention that Europe and Asia are full continents rather than subcontinents or component landmasses of a larger Eurasian continent.

Listed further below, separately, are countries with distant non-contiguous parts (overseas territories) on separate continents.

Definition
The lists within this article include entries that meet the following criteria:
Transcontinental or intercontinental states are sovereign states that have some portion of their territory geographically divided between at least two continents.
Transcontinental states can be classed as either contiguous or non-contiguous transcontinental states.
Contiguous transcontinental states are those countries that have one continuous or immediately adjacent piece of territory that spans a continental boundary. More specifically, they contain a portion of their territory on one continent and a portion of their territory on another continent, while having these two portions connected via a natural geological land connection (e.g. Russia) or the two portions being immediately adjacent to one another (e.g. Turkey).
Non-contiguous transcontinental states are those that have portions of territory that are separated from one another either by a significant body of water or by other land. Most non-contiguous transcontinental countries are countries with overseas territories.
The boundaries between the continents can be vague and subject to interpretation, making it difficult to conclusively define what counts as a 'transcontinental state'.
For the purposes of this article, a seven-continent model is assumed.
Therefore, states that have territory across sub-continental boundaries, as well as plate boundaries that are only internal to continents, are excluded from this article.
Some non-contiguous transcontinental states have territory situated on distant islands that may or may not be considered a part of another nearby continent (e.g. Yemen's Socotra and Portugal's Madeira). Though there is debate as to whether these states ought to be considered 'transcontinental', they are still included in this article.
States that only have uninhabited island territory as a part of another continent (e.g., Venezuela's Aves Island) are considered transcontinental for the purpose of this article.
While it is debatable as to whether states that have claimed territory within the Antarctic Treaty System can have actual control of that claimed territory (e.g., Chilean Antarctic Territory), they are included in this article.
Some autonomous regions (or dependent territories) may be constitutionally distinguishable from the parent state that claims them as their territory (e.g., in the case of British Overseas Territories and the United Kingdom), thereby causing debate as to whether such states ought to be considered 'transcontinental'. They are nevertheless included in this article.
Micronations, autonomous regions, and sub-national entities that are in themselves transcontinental are excluded from the lists in this article as a separate entry from their controlling state.
Any entry must be a UN member state or a part of the United Nations System. Therefore, states with limited recognition are excluded from the lists in this article.

Contiguous boundary 

Contiguous transcontinental states are those countries that have one continuous or immediately adjacent piece of territory that spans a continental boundary. More specifically, they contain a portion of their territory on one continent and a portion of their territory on another continent, while having these two portions connected via a natural geological land connection (e.g. Russia) or the two portions being immediately adjacent to one another (e.g. Turkey).

Africa and Asia 

The modern convention for the land boundary between Asia and Africa runs along the Isthmus of Suez and the Suez Canal in Egypt. The border continues through the Gulf of Suez, Red Sea, and Gulf of Aden. In antiquity, Egypt had been considered part of Asia, with the Catabathmus Magnus escarpment taken as the boundary with Africa (Libya).

 : Out of the 27 governorates of Egypt, two lie entirely on the Asian Sinai Peninsula and two are transcontinental: Ismailia Governorate is nearly equally divided by the Suez Canal, and Suez Governorate—which is coterminous with the "transcontinental city" of Suez—has a small portion east of the Canal.

Asia and Europe 

The conventional Europe-Asia boundary was subject to considerable variation during the 18th and 19th centuries, indicated anywhere between the Don River and the Caucasus to the south or the Ural Mountains to the east. Since the late-19th century, the Caucasus–Urals boundary has become almost universally accepted. According to this now-standard convention, the boundary follows the Aegean Sea, the Turkish Straits, the Black Sea, along the watershed of the Greater Caucasus, the northwestern portion of the Caspian Sea and along the Ural River and Ural Mountains to the Arctic Ocean.

According to this convention, the following states have territory in both Asia and Europe.

 : Azerbaijan is a country located mainly on the Asian portion of the Caucasus; with a small portion of the country, its Qusar, Shabran, Siazan, Khachmaz and Quba districts north of the Greater Caucasus Watershed, and thus in Europe, placing a population of about half a million (or ca. 5% of the country's total population) in Europe.
 : Georgia is located mainly on the Asian portion of the Caucasus; however, the Municipality of Kazbegi, north Khevsureti and Tusheti are located north of the Greater Caucasus Watershed, which is geographically in Europe, with mountain peaks throughout the Caucasus ridge, placing around 5% of the country's total territory in Europe. Despite its geography, Georgia is considered a European country geopolitically because of its historical, cultural, ethnical, and political ties to the continent.
 : Kazakhstan is a country mainly located in Central Asia, with a small portion of the country extending west of the Ural River in Eastern Europe. The country's physical, cultural, ethnic, and geographic characteristics are Central Asian, with a large European influence and influx of European settlers from Russia from when it was a part of the Soviet Union and the earlier Russian Empire. Its West Kazakhstan and Atyrau regions extend on either side of the Ural River, placing a population of less than one million residents (out of a 15 million total population) geographically in Europe. Because the city of Atyrau straddles the Ural River, it can be considered a transcontinental city.
 : Russia, the largest country in the world, spans most of northern Eurasia; stretching over a vast expanse of Eastern Europe and Northern Asia. Its sparsely populated Asian territory was historically incorporated into the Tsardom of Russia in the 17th century by conquests. Russia is considered a European country, as it has historical, cultural, ethnical, and political ties to the continent. The vast majority of its population (80%) lives within its European portion, making it the most populous European nation. Russia's capital Moscow is the largest city entirely in Europe. 
 : Turkey falls almost wholly within Western Asia (the Asian portion of Turkey composing the Anatolian Peninsula and additional land) plus a smaller portion of the country in the Balkan Peninsula in Southeastern Europe called East Thrace, which covers only 3% of the country's total area, with a population of about 11 million people, or some 14% of the country's population. Turkey's largest city Istanbul spans both sides of the Bosphorus, making it a "transcontinental city" in both Europe and Asia, while the country's capital Ankara is located in Asia. The territory of the current Turkish state is the core territory of the previous Ottoman Empire that was also transcontinental in the same geographic region, which itself had also supplanted the earlier, similarly transcontinental Byzantine Empire.

North America and South America 

The conventional boundary between North America and South America is at some point on the Colombia–Panama border, with the most common demarcation in atlases and other sources following the Darién Mountains watershed where the Isthmus of Panama meets the South American continent (see Darién Gap). This area encompasses a large watershed, forest and mountains in the northern portion of Colombia's Chocó Department and Panama's Darién Province. Since both Panama and Colombia traditionally view the Americas as a single continent, the Darién border is locally presented not as between the continents of North and South America but rather as between the subcontinental regions of Central and South America.

 : Since the political boundary between Panama and Colombia is not entirely determined by natural features, some geographers prefer to use the Panama Canal as the physical boundary between North and South America instead. Under this convention, Panama is classified as a transcontinental country while its capital Panama City is classified as a South American city. Panamanian sports governing bodies affiliate to differing continental/regional confederations: its athletics federation to South America's, its soccer federation to North, Central America and Caribbean's; its Olympic committee to both South America's and Central America's.
 : Until the separation of Panama from Colombia in 1903, Colombia included territory in North America. [map]

Non-contiguous

North America and South America 

 : Most of Colombia, predominantly its mainland, is located in northern South America (see North America and South America above) and the Malpelo Island in the Pacific Ocean is also associated with South America (or on rare occasion Oceania, due to its status as an oceanic island). However, the state also administers the San Andrés and Providencia archipelago,  WNW of Colombia's Caribbean Coast, in North America.
  (Aves Island): Most of Venezuela, predominantly its mainland, is located in northern South America. Aves Island, however, is geographically a definitive part of North America. It is one of the Federal Dependencies of Venezuela which are under the administration of the Ministry of Interior, Justice and Peace.
The special case of Caribbean islands adjacent to the South American coastline:
 : The state of Trinidad and Tobago lies on two tectonic plates. The southern half of Trinidad lies on the South American Plate while the northern half of Trinidad and the island of Tobago lie on the Caribbean Plate. However, these geological features do not necessarily qualify Trinidad and Tobago as a transcontinental state, as the whole territory is often labeled geopolitically as part of North America.
 Leeward Antilles (Collectively Aruba, Bonaire, and Curaçao of the Netherlands; Nueva Esparta of Venezuela; and the Federal Dependencies of Venezuela, excluding Aves Island): The Caribbean islands division of North America and South America is complicated. Geopolitically, all Caribbean islands in the West Indies are often labeled as North American islands, but geologically, the islands of the Leeward Antilles lie on the continental shelf of South America, and can be considered South American as well. Excluding the geographically North American Aves Island, the remaining Venezuelan islands of the Federal Dependencies are islands situated in the Caribbean Sea on the continental shelf of South America. These islands are north of the Venezuelan mainland and are akin to the location of Aruba, Bonaire, Curaçao, and Trinidad and Tobago. Similarly, the islands of the State of Nueva Esparta (Margarita Island, Coche Island, and Cubagua) are also situated in the Caribbean Sea just to the north of the Caribbean coastline of the Venezuelan mainland. However, all of the non-Venezuelan islands in this area are typically considered North American rather than South American.

Caribbean Island locations 
North American Caribbean islands administered by South American states:

Caribbean islands considered North American or South American:

North America, Oceania, and Asia 
 : While the territory of the United States lies overwhelmingly in North America, it includes the state of Hawaii in Oceania, as well as several other Oceanian island possessions. These islands include American Samoa (in Polynesia), Guam and the Northern Mariana Islands (in Micronesia) and the United States Minor Outlying Islands (Baker Island, Howland Island, Jarvis Island, Midway Atoll, Palmyra Atoll and Wake Island). Additionally, the territory of the United States also encompasses Alaskan islands on Northeast Asia's continental shelf. Most of these islands are always associated with North America, except for the westernmost Near Islands group, which is on Asia's continental shelf beyond the North Aleutians Basin and on rare occasions could be associated with Asia, which could then allow the U.S. state of Alaska to be considered a transcontinental state. Alaska's Aleutian Islands, located at the northernmost tip of the Pacific Ocean, have also been considered part of Oceania on rare occasions, due to the remote nature of the western islands, and their close proximity to the Pacific Plate. The islands, however, have Indigenous American inhabitants and non-tropical biogeography, and as such they are excluded from most standard definitions of Oceania.

South America and Oceania 
 : Chile is mostly on the South American mainland and includes the islands of Easter Island and Isla Salas y Gómez, which are within the Oceania subregion of Polynesia. Those and the oceanic Juan Fernández Islands and Desventuradas Islands are part of Insular Chile.
 : The Pacific Ocean archipelago of the Galápagos Islands, about 1,000 kilometers from continental Ecuador, is sometimes considered part of Oceania. This is because of the distance separating them from mainland South America, and their oceanic geology. The islands lie on the Nazca Plate with Easter Island, which is considered to be separate to the South American Plate, and they additionally border the Pacific Plate. The Galápagos Islands did not have any known human ties to South America during the pre-Columbian era; however, they also do not fit into a cultural subregion of Oceania and the Pacific, as is the case with Easter Island, which historically was Polynesian.

Europe and North America 

 : As a constituent part of the Danish Realm, Greenland is a non-sovereign country within the Kingdom of Denmark. Fully located on the North American tectonic plate, and close to the mainland, Greenland is considered to be geographically a part of North America, with the United Nations categorizing them as such. Although it is politically associated with Europe and internationally represented by a European state (including in the Council of Europe), it is autonomous. Historically and ethnically, its native population is of North American tradition, although it also shares cultural links with other native peoples bordering the Arctic Sea in Northern Europe and Asia (today in Norway, Sweden, Finland and Russia), as well as in North America (Alaska in the U.S., Northwest Territories, Nunavut and northern parts of Quebec and Labrador in Canada). Greenland was part of Danish territory and within the territory of the European Union, but voted for more autonomy and is now excluded from the EU.

Europe, North America, and South America 
 : Though most of the Kingdom of the Netherlands' landmass is in Europe, it also includes six island territories in the Lesser Antilles archipelago of the Caribbean Sea: the Dutch Caribbean. Within the Lesser Antilles archipelago, three territories are in the Leeward Islands group (considered part of the continent of North America) and three in the Leeward Antilles group (on the South American continental shelf). Since the dissolution of the Dutch Antilles in 2010, the sovereign Kingdom of the Netherlands has been administratively divided into four non-sovereign constituent "countries": Aruba, Curaçao, Sint Maarten and the Netherlands — the last of which includes the islands of Bonaire, Saint Eustatius and Saba (collectively known as the BES islands or the Caribbean Netherlands) as "special municipalities", making it a non-sovereign transcontinental constituent country within the Kingdom.

Europe, North America, South America, Oceania, Africa, and Antarctica 
 : Metropolitan France is located in Europe, while the five overseas departments and regions, five overseas collectivities, and one Sui generis collectivity are located in other continental regions. Guadeloupe, Martinique, Saint Barthélemy, Saint Martin, and Saint Pierre and Miquelon are located in North America, French Guiana is located in South America, Mayotte and Réunion are located in Africa, and French Polynesia, Wallis and Futuna, and New Caledonia are located in Oceania. These 11 populated territories of overseas France are integral parts of France, as are the uninhabited Clipperton Island (considered either North American or Oceanian) and the uninhabited French Southern and Antarctic Lands, which include the claimed Adélie Land on the Antarctic mainland, the Crozet Islands and the Kerguelen Islands in the Antarctic region, Saint Paul and Amsterdam Islands on the Australian Plate, and the Scattered Islands in the Indian Ocean. French sovereignty claim on Adélie Land is in abeyance under the Antarctic Treaty System. France has territory in each continental region except Asia.

Europe, North America, South America, Oceania, Africa, Asia, and Antarctica 
 : The territory of the United Kingdom itself is located entirely within Europe. However, the UK is the sovereign state of 'one, undivided Realm' consisting of all territory under the sovereignty of the British Crown, i.e. itself, the British Overseas Territories and the Crown Dependencies. All are on islands, apart from Gibraltar, which is on Eurasia.

Africa and Europe 

 : Italy has a number of small islands south of Sicily which can be considered part of the African continent, due to their proximity to Tunisia. The closest land to Pantelleria and the Pelagie Islands (Lampedusa, Linosa and Lampione) is Tunisia on the African mainland. Nevertheless, Pantelleria and Linosa are considered part of Europe, Lampedusa and Lampione part of Africa.
 : Continental Portugal is in Europe, while the archipelago of Madeira, an Autonomous Region (including Porto Santo Island, the Desertas Islands and the Savage Islands), is associated with Africa. If the Azores Autonomous Region is considered to be split as two island groups (with the westernmost Flores Island and Corvo Island on the North American tectonic plate being a distinct group from the rest), Portugal would be a transcontinental state geologically (see Europe and North America above). However, geologic tectonic plate separation does not necessarily define geographical continental distinction.
 : Although its mainland is in Europe, Spain has territory including two provinces and two autonomous cities in Africa. Close to 5% of Spain's population live on the African continent. Territories include the Canary Islands in the Atlantic, the cities of Ceuta and Melilla on mainland North Africa and its plazas de soberanía, which are close to those cities that are geographically part of Africa. The Canary Islands, Ceuta and Melilla are three of the 19 autonomous communities and cities that form Spain, while the plazas de soberanía are under a different status, akin to unincorporated territories. The African Mediterranean island of Alboran belongs to the transcontinental city of Almería and the transcontinental province of Almería.

Asia and Africa 
 : Although mainland Yemen is in the southern Arabian Peninsula and thus part of Asia, and its Hanish Islands, Zubair Group, and Perim in the Red Sea are associated with Asia, Yemen's national territory extends to the archipelago of Socotra, which lies east of the horn of Somalia and is much closer to Africa than to Asia.

Asia and Europe 

 : The territory of Greece includes a number of islands just off the coast of Asia Minor, such as Rhodes, Kos, Samos, Chios, Lesbos, Kastellorizo, Strongyli Megistis, and Ro.

Asia and Oceania 
 : The Commonwealth of Australia consists of its namesake continent and island possessions associated with Oceania, Asia, and Antarctica. Its Indian Ocean island possessions of Christmas Island and the Cocos (Keeling) Islands are sometimes geographically associated with Southeast Asia. The majority of residents on these islands have Asian ancestry; there is also a proportion of Australians and New Zealanders on the islands who have European ancestry. The islands have no proper indigenous population, as they were only discovered in the 17th century, by Europeans. Christmas Island and Cocos (Keeling) Islands are classified as being the westernmost areas of Oceania by the World Factbook, and are also considered part of Oceania by the United Nations. They are within the Australian Plate, and could potentially be geographically part of Oceania under definitions that include the nearby Malay Archipelago, or under definitions which are based on tectonic plates.
 : Japan's Izu islands and Bonin Islands (consisting of the Volcano Islands, and three remote islands; Nishinoshima, Minami-Tori-shima and Okinotorishima) are sometimes considered part of Oceania, owing to their oceanic nature. The Bonin Islands belong to the Oceanian biogeographic realm, and are believed to have once been inhabited by Indigenous peoples of Oceania around 2,000 years ago, with their official discovery coming much later in the 16th century, through Europeans. The most isolated island, Minami-Tori-shima (also known as Marcus Island) is 2,000 kilometers removed from Tokyo, lying closer to the northernmost islands of Micronesia.
  and : Indonesia (excluding Western New Guinea) and Timor-Leste are occasionally associated with Oceania, as they are the closest to Australia and Melanesia out of all countries in the Malay Archipelago. Indonesia currently controls Western New Guinea, which is culturally associated with Oceania, and geologically a part of the Australian landmass. Moreover, Indonesian territories include the province of East Nusa Tenggara (which Timor-Leste shares a border with) and the Moluccan archipelago, both of which lie within Wallacea and have been considered as geographical and cultural intersections of Asia and Oceania.

Antarctica and other continents

Sub-Antarctic region 
 Argentina, Australia, Chile, France, New Zealand, Norway, South Africa, and the United Kingdom: These eight states have overseas island possessions in the Subantarctic region between 46°S and 60°S latitude. The United Nations categorize Bouvet Island and South Georgia and the South Sandwich Islands as part of South America, and Heard Island and McDonald Islands as part of Oceania. South Georgia and the South Sandwich Islands is sometimes considered to be geographically within the bounds of South America; however, the other islands are among the most isolated locations in the world. Human activity is very limited on Bouvet Island and Heard Island and McDonald Islands; for example, the McDonald Islands have only ever been visited twice throughout their entire recorded history, with the last visit being in 1980. The World Factbook categorize Bouvet Island and Heard Island and McDonald Islands as part of Antarctica rather than South America/Oceania.

Antarctic region 
 Argentina, Australia, Chile, France, New Zealand, Norway, and the United Kingdom: These seven states claim portions of the Antarctic mainland (some of them overlapping), as well as its associated islands south of 60°S latitude. Some, including Argentina and Chile, consider the Antarctic land they claim to be integral parts of their national territory. However, none of these claims are recognized by the United Nations and the international community. Since 1961, the Antarctic Treaty System has held in abeyance all land claims south of 60°S latitude, including Antarctica's ice shelves and Antarctic islands.

Countries formerly and/or never widely or officially considered as transcontinental countries

Asia and Oceania 
Many initial 19th century definitions of Oceania included most or all of the Malay Archipelago. Definitions of Oceania which include the Malay Archipelago are much rarer today; the non-oceanic nature of the Malay Archipelago and its geological connections to Asia may not have been as widely known in the 19th century. The Philippines are the closest to the Oceania subregion of Micronesia, and are sometimes historically associated with it, mainly due to their shared Christian cultures and Spanish colonial histories, and their shared Austronesian backgrounds. Anthropologically, New Guinea is a part of Melanesia, but it is sometimes included in the Malay Archipelago. The state of Papua New Guinea is an observer in the Association of Southeast Asian Nations (ASEAN), which includes mainland states of Southeast Asia, and has contemplated full membership in this organisation. Indonesia, Malaysia, the Philippines and Singapore (as well as Japan) are all dialogue partners of the Pacific Islands Forum (PIF), and Timor-Leste are an observer. However, only countries solely associated with Oceania have full membership, such as Australia, Federated States of Micronesia, Fiji, New Zealand and Samoa.

North America and Oceania 
  and : Oceania at times is considered to encompass all oceanic islands in the Pacific Ocean. Oceanic islands are defined as islands that were never connected to a continental landmass, and which formed through volcanic acitivity in the ocean. Mexico administer the oceanic Guadalupe Island and Revillagigedo Islands, and the oceanic islet of Rocas Alijos, while Costa Rica administer the oceanic Cocos Island. All of these islands were uninhabited prior to European discovery, and none lie on the North American or South American tectonic plates; the Mexican islands lie on the Pacific Plate with most of Oceania, and Cocos Island lies on the self-named Cocos Plate, which contains no other islands besides Colombia's Malpelo Island. Furthermore, the Mexican state of Baja California, despite being physiologically connected to the American landmass, is in fact part of the Pacific Plate. Guadalupe Island and Rocas Alijos are rarely categorized with other Pacific Islands, as they are only 250 to 300 kilometers removed from Baja California. Revillagigedo's most remote island, Clarion, is 700 kilometers from Mexico's coast, and Cocos Island is 550 kilometers from Costa Rica's coast. These islands are more frequently associated with the term Pacific Islands, and occasionally have been included as part of Oceania. Remoter islands such as France's Clipperton (1,100 kilometers from Mexico's coast) are even more commonly associated with Oceania, with such islands usually having stronger biogeographical affinities to the central Pacific or south Pacific.

See also 
 Boundaries between the continents of Earth
 Dependent territory
 Historical powers
 List of countries by continent
 List of former transcontinental countries
 Thalassocracy

Notes

References

External links 
 

transcontinental